Jordaaniella is a genus of plants in the family Aizoaceae. The plants of this genus are indigenous to southern Africa.

Species include (among many others):

Jordaaniella anemoniflora (L.Bolus) van Jaarsv.
Jordaaniella clavifolia (L.Bolus) H.E.K.Hartmann
Jordaaniella cuprea (L.Bolus) H.E.K.Hartmann
Jordaaniella dubia (Haw.) H.E.K.Hartmann
Jordaaniella maritima (L.Bolus) van Jaarsv.
Jordaaniella spongiosa (L.Bolus) H.E.K.Hartmann
Jordaaniella uniflora (L.Bolus) H.E.K.Hartmann

 
Aizoaceae genera
Fynbos
Endemic flora of South Africa
Taxa named by Heidrun Hartmann